The Porsche Club of America (PCA) is a non profit organization of Porsche enthusiasts in the United States and Canada. It is organized into 147 regions, which are grouped into 14 zones. PCA has more than 150,000 members and is the largest single-brand club in the world.

For 68 years, the Porsche Club of America has been dedicated to enhancing the Porsche ownership experience. No matter what your interest - social, technical, or competitive - PCA has something to offer every Porsche owner.

PCA members know the unbridled joy that owning a Porsche can provide, and PCA has built a community around that very feeling. The Porsche Club of America offers driving experience, technical assistance, member benefits, and camaraderie second to none. Over the years, the club has grown to 147 Regions across North America. PCA guarantees there is a PCA Region near you filled with friendly Porsche fanatics.

PCA believes all Porsches are equal. So, whether you are passionate about your 356, 911, 912, 914, 924, 928, 944, 968, Macan, Cayenne, Cayman, Boxster, Taycan, Panamera or any of the other amazing Porsche models, you are always welcome at PCA events and gatherings.

From over 3,800 local and national events including driving activities, social gatherings, autocross, track days, high performance driver education, club racing, tech sessions, car shows, sim racing, insider exclusives and premieres: there's something for everyone at PCA.

Membership is open to all Porsche owners, co-owners, or lessees who are 18 years of age or older. At the time of joining, the member of record is permitted to name either a relative or other interested person to become an affiliate member, at no additional cost. The family or affiliate member also must be 18 years of age or older.

Porsche Club of America maintains a website with PCA and Porsche news, technical info, digital features and member-specific content.

If you don't yet own a Porsche but want to join PCA, consider entering the PCA Test Drive Program.

History 
The club was founded in 1955 in Washington, D.C.

Bill Sholar, who was a commercial artist in the Washington, D.C. area in the early 1950s bought a new 1953 356 Coupe, and, as time passed, he met other Porsches on the road and flashed his lights at them in silent greeting. By late 1954, Sholar was convinced that a more personal meeting would be appropriate with other Porsche owners to discuss the positive and the not-so-positive aspects of driving the infrequently encountered marque. The first unofficial PCA meeting was held at the Sholar house on 8 February 1955. Following that meeting, several Porsche owners occasionally got together that spring and summer to share knowledge about Porsches. Eventually, they decided to start a club. A brief paragraph in the August 1955 issue of Sports Car Illustrated informed readers that a Porsche club was being formed in the United States; all inquiries were directed to Bill Sholar's attention. As part of the effort, Porsche was petitioned to recognize the proposed club.

Today, activities range from competitive events, such as autocrossing, club racing, rallying, sim racing, and Concours, to social events, such as touring, weekend trips, drive and dines, vehicle restoration, and Porsche history. A revised Treffen® now allows PCA members to visit the factory, the new Porsche Museum, the area around Stuttgart, Germany, and the research-and-development unit at Weissach. A professional staff, headed by Executive Director Vu Nguyen, operates the National Office in Columbia, Maryland, where a growing historical section is also housed. One of the objectives stated in PCA's Bylaws is to promote the enjoyment and sharing of goodwill and fellowship engendered by owning a Porsche.

Events 

PCA is best known for its events. With over 3,800 annual events and activities, the club has something for every Porsche enthusiast. The club's largest event is the annual Porsche Parade, which is a week-long event where members from around the country gather to participate in various events, such as autocross and Concours d'Elegance. Treffen North America are weekend events held twice a year and focus on driving tours, great locations and fine dining. PCA also hosts two national tech sessions each year called Tech Tactics, with one in California and one in Pennsylvania, as well as two national Concours-style car shows named Werks Reunion, that are held in California and Florida.

PCA Regions across North America host thousands of events each year including driving tours, car shows, club racing, rallying, driver's education, autocrosses, social events, and similar activities.

Each spring and fall, Porsche Club of America opens a member only raffle, in which members may purchase entries for a chance to win a brand-new Porsche. A number of Porsches have also been made specifically for the club, such as the Porsche 991 GTS Club Coupe, which was to celebrate the club's 60th anniversary.

Regions 
PCA is arranged into 147 local Regions in 14 zones across the United States and Canada. Each operates as their own motor club. As of January 2023, the Upper Canada Region is the largest region with over 2,900 members.

Further reading
 1982  – Porsche Panorama: The First 25 Years (https://books.google.com/books?id=1mhRYgEACAAJ&dq=%22Porsche+Club+of+America%22&hl=en&sa=X&ei=qVrWU8WGM6HesASm2ID4Bw&ved=0CGIQ6AEwBw)
 2014  – Nanaimo Daily News: Vancouver Island Region Porsche Club of America raised more than $14,000 for charity

References

External links
 The Porsche Club of America - web site
 Treffen North America
 Porsche Parade
 PCA Club Racing
 PCA membership

Porsche
Motor clubs
Automobile associations in the United States
Clubs and societies in the United States